Wilhelm Ténint (20 May 1817, Paris – 26 April 1879, Stockholm) was a minor French Romantic writer.

He was a fervent admirer of Victor Hugo and of the "modern school" of Romantic literature. He published in Parisian literary journals such as La Presse, and was a member of the Société des gens de lettres. In 1844, he published a handbook for and defense of Romantic prosody titled Prosodie de l'école moderne, which had a brief introduction by Hugo and a longer introduction by Emile Deschamps. Ténint's handbook mistakenly claimed that the unique, nonce structure of Jean Passerat's 1574 "Villanelle" was an old French form akin to terza rima; the poet Théodore de Banville subsequently "revived" this "Renaissance form," thus helping to create the modern 19-line poetic form called the villanelle. Ténint was placed under house arrest for pederasty in 1851 and thereafter left France for Sweden, where he translated Swedish works into French.

References 

1813 births
1879 deaths
19th-century French male writers
19th-century French LGBT people
19th-century translators
French expatriates in Sweden
People prosecuted under anti-homosexuality laws
Translators from Swedish
Translators to French
Writers from Paris